Erik Fritiof Billquist (5 May 1901 – 21 April 1972) was a Swedish film actor. He appeared in more than 60 films between 1931 and 1969.

Selected filmography

 Tired Theodore (1931)
 International Match (1932)
 South of the Highway (1936)
 Raggen (1936)
 Comrades in Uniform (1938)
 Circus (1939)
 Bashful Anton (1940)
 Västkustens hjältar (1940)
 In Paradise (1941)
 Men of the Navy (1943)
 Life and Death (1943)
 Turn of the Century (1944)
 The Happy Tailor (1945)
 Jolanta the Elusive Pig (1945)
 Private Karlsson on Leave (1947)
 Främmande hamn (1948)
 Loffe as a Millionaire (1948)
 A Swedish Tiger (1948)
 Bohus Battalion (1949)
 Restaurant Intim (1950)
 Customs Officer Bom (1951)
 Dance, My Doll (1953)
 Hidden in the Fog (1953)
 The Vicious Breed (1954)
 My Passionate Longing (1956)
 The Biscuit (1956)
 More Than a Match for the Navy (1958)

External links

1901 births
1972 deaths
Swedish male film actors
20th-century Swedish male actors